James P. Kennett is an American paleoceanographer. In 1986, Kennett became the founding editor of Paleoceanography, and in May 2000, he was elected as a member of the National Academy of Sciences. He is also a cofounder and member of the Comet Research Group.

References

External links 

 UCSB Bio
 Homepage

1940 births
Victoria University of Wellington alumni
University of New Zealand alumni
Florida State University faculty
University of Rhode Island faculty
University of California, Santa Barbara faculty
Fellows of the Royal Society of New Zealand
Fellows of the Geological Society of America
Fellows of the American Geophysical Union
Fellows of the American Academy of Arts and Sciences
Members of the United States National Academy of Sciences
Living people